IOzone is a file system benchmark utility. Originally made by William Norcott, further enhanced by Don Capps and others.

Source code is available from iozone.org. It does mmap() file I/O and uses POSIX Threads.

It won the 2007 Infoworld Bossie Awards for Best file I/O tool.

The Windows version of IOzone uses Cygwin. Builds are available for AIX, BSDI, HP-UX, IRIX, FreeBSD, Linux, OpenBSD, NetBSD, OSFV3, OSFV4, OSFV5, SCO OpenServer, Solaris, Mac OS X, Windows (95/98/Me/NT/2K/XP).

It is available as a test profile in the Phoronix Test Suite.

References

External links 
 
 Documentation
 

Benchmarks (computing)
Linux file system-related software